Works of mercy (sometimes known as acts of mercy) are practices considered meritorious in Christian ethics.

The practice is popular in the Catholic Church as an act of both penance and charity. In addition, the Methodist church teaches that the works of mercy are a means of grace which lead to holiness and aid in sanctification.

The works of mercy have been traditionally divided into two categories, each with seven elements:  
 "Corporal works of mercy" which concern the material and physical needs of others.
 "Spiritual works of mercy" which concern the spiritual needs of others.

Pope John Paul II issued a papal encyclical "Dives in misericordia" on 30 November 1980 declaring that "Jesus Christ taught that man not only receives and experiences the mercy of God, but that he is also called 'to practice mercy' towards others." Another notable devotion associated with the works of mercy is the Divine Mercy, which derives from apparitions of Jesus Christ to Saint Faustina Kowalska.

In the Catholic Church
Based on Jesus' doctrine of the sheep and the goats, the corporal and spiritual works of mercy are a means of grace as good deeds; it is also a work of justice pleasing to God.

The precept is an affirmative one, that is, it is of the sort which is always binding but not always operative, for lack of matter or occasion or fitting circumstances. In general it may be said that the determination of its actual obligatory force in a given case depends largely on one's capacity. There are easily recognizable limitations which the precept undergoes in practice so far as the performance of the corporal works of mercy are concerned. Likewise the law imposing spiritual works of mercy is subject in individual instances to important reservations. For example, some may require particular tact, prudence, or knowledge. Similarly to instruct the ignorant, counsel the doubtful, and console the sorrowing is not always within the competency of every one. However, to bear wrongs patiently, to forgive offences willingly, and to pray for the living and the dead, do not require some special array of gifts or talent for their observance.

In an address on the 2016 World Day of Prayer for Creation, Pope Francis suggested "care for creation" as a new work of mercy, describing it as a "complement" to the existing works. Francis characterized this new work as having both corporal and spiritual components. Corporally, it involves "daily gestures which break with the logic of violence, exploitation and selfishness". Spiritually, it involves contemplating each part of creation to find what God is teaching us through them. This pronouncement extensively quoted the encyclical Laudato si', and Cardinal Peter Turkson, who helped write the encyclical, clarified that the addition of this work of mercy was part of Francis' intention for Laudato si'''.

Corporal works of mercy

Corporal works of mercy are those that tend to the bodily needs of other creatures. The standard list is given by Jesus in Chapter 25 of the Gospel of Matthew, in the famous sermon on the Last Judgment. They are also mentioned in the Book of Isaiah. The seventh work of mercy comes from the Book of Tobit and from the mitzvah of burial, although it was not added to the list until the Middle Ages.

The works include:
 To feed the hungry.
 To give water to the thirsty.
 To clothe the naked.
 To shelter the homeless. 
 To visit the sick.
 To visit the imprisoned, or ransom the captive. 
 To bury the dead.

Spiritual works of mercy
Just as the corporal works of mercy are directed towards relieving corporeal suffering, the aim of the spiritual works of mercy is to relieve spiritual suffering.

The works include:
To instruct the ignorant.
To counsel the doubtful.
To admonish the sinners.
To bear patiently those who wrong us.
To forgive offenses.
To comfort the afflicted.
To pray for the living and the dead.

 Representation in art 
The Corporal works of mercy are an important subject of Christian iconography. In some representations of the Middle Ages, the seven works were allegorically juxtaposed with the seven deadly sins (avarice, anger, envy, laziness, unchastity, intemperance, pride). The pictorial representation of the works of mercy began in the 12th century.

The Master of Alkmaar painted the polyptych of the Seven works of mercy (ca. 1504) for the Church of Saint Lawrence in Alkmaar, Netherlands. His series of wooden panel paintings show the works of mercy, with Jesus in the background viewing each, in this order: feed the hungry, give drink to the thirsty, clothe the naked, bury the dead, shelter the traveler, comfort the sick, and ransom the captive.

The painting of the Seven Works of Mercy by Frans II Francken (1605) represents the acts not as a picture cycle, but in one single composition.

A major work of the iconography of mercy is the altarpiece of Caravaggio (1606/07) in Naples, which was commissioned by the Confraternità del Pio Monte della Misericordia for their church. This charity brotherhood was founded in 1601 in Naples. The artist painted the Seven Works of Mercy'' in one single composition. Regarding the sharp contrasts of the painting's chiaroscuro, the art historian Ralf van Bühren explains the bright light as a metaphor for mercy, which "helps the audience to explore mercy in their own lives".

In Methodism
In Methodist teaching, doing merciful acts is a prudential means of grace. Along with works of piety, they are necessary for the believer to move on to Christian perfection. In this sense, the Methodist concern for people at the margins is closely related to its worship. As such, these beliefs have helped create the emphasis of the social gospel in the Methodist Church.

Works of Mercy
Doing Good
Visiting the Sick and Prisoners
Feeding and Clothing People
Earning, Saving, Giving All One Can
Opposition to Slavery

See also

Further reading

References

External links

"The Means of Grace" by John Wesley
Seven Corporal Works of Mercy in English painted churches (online catalog of medieval depictions, Anne Marschall, The Open University)

Methodism
Christian ethics
Catholic theology and doctrine
Christian terminology